Kuibyshevskyi District is an urban district of the city of Donetsk, Ukraine, named after a Soviet political figure Valerian Kuybyshev.

It was created in 1937 as one of the first six original city districts. It is located at the northwestern part of the city.

Residential neighborhoods
Multi-storey developments
 Mahistralnyi
 Industrialnyi
 Azotnyi
 Zhylkop
 Karier
 Hirnyk
 Flora
 Zhovtneve
 Topaz
 Ploshcha Bakynskykh Komisariv
Settlements
 Smolyanka
 Zhovtneve
 Khimik
 Chervonyi Pakhar
 Hrabary
 Lozivske
 Administratyvnyi
 Hirnyk

Industry
 Mines
 Zhovtnevyi Rudnyk coal mine (part of the Donetsk Coal Power Company), flooded by militants of the Donetsk People's Republic
 Kuibyshevska mine (part of the production association Donetskvuhillya), closed down
 Maksim Gorky mine (part of the production association Donetskvuhillya)
 Panfilovska mine (under the Mine Liquidation Administration), closed down
 Donetsk Coke-Production Factory, closed down
 Donbas Cable
 Topaz Factory, a military production factory with a design bureau of radio-technical instruments (among its products is Kolchuga passive sensor) in 2016 relocated to Russia by militants of the Donetsk People's Republic
 Donetsk Factory of chemical agents
 Donetsk Factory of chemical products

Places

Notable people
 Akhat Bragin

References

External links
 Kuibyshev Raion at the Mayor of Donetsk website
 Kuibyshev Raion at the Uzovka website

Urban districts of Donetsk